The Abu Dhabi Junior Golf Championship (ADJGC), in association with The Telegraph, is an international golf tournament for players under the age of 18 years, the finals of which will be held from November 22 to 24, 2011 at the Abu Dhabi Golf Club in the United Arab Emirates. The current boys champion is Ben Taylor and Hayley Davis holds the 2010 girls title.

Background 
The tournament has its origins in the 1960s, when it was organised by The Daily Telegraph. In the early days it was an informally organised competition that took place during the school holidays. Today it attracts a considerable field of junior golfers from Great Britain and Ireland and offers boys and girls the opportunity to experience a major tournament and ultimately bid to become the Junior Golf Champion. In recent years, around 40,000 juniors have taken part in the qualifying round.

It is open to all permanent British and Irish residents under the age of 18 at the start of the year. A handicap of 28 and below for boys and 36 and below for girls is required. This year, a player from the Middle East will also take part in the finals.

Format 
The finals of the Abu Dhabi Junior Golf Championship, in association with The Telegraph, will feature 10 boys who qualify via the leaderboard, one boy who will receive a sponsor’s invite, the girls' defending champion Hayley Davis, seven girls who qualify via the leaderboard and one girl who will receive a sponsor’s invite . The winner of the Abu Dhabi Golf Club Junior Open, which took place the month before, will also complete the 21-strong field.

Before the finals begin, a challenge match will take place, in which 21 of the UAE and Middle East’s best young players will compete with the visitors.

History 
Success in the tournament has acted as a springboard for some exceptional young golfers, with past winners including Justin Rose and Andrew Coltart, who have gone on to play at the highest level. Current boys and girls champions Stiggy Hodgson and Carly Booth have both represented Great Britain and Ireland in amateur tournaments.

Other past champions of note include Mhairi McKay, Rebecca Hudson and Oliver Fisher.

Wwinners 
Boys
 1985	Terry Berry
 1986	Andrew Coltart
 1987	Michael Watson
 1988	Michael Welch
 1989	Nick Ludwell
 1990	Duncan Smith
 1991	Graham Davidson
 1992	Allan MacDonald
 1993	Denny Lucas
 1994	Denny Lucas
 1995	David Wixon
 1996	Graham Gordon
 1997	Justin Rose
 1998	David Griffiths
 1999	David Skinns
 2000	David Mallett
 2001	Michael Nester
 2002	Michael Skelton
 2003	James Ruth
 2004	Jordan Findlay
 2005	Oliver Fisher
 2006	Dale Whitnell
 2007	Stiggy Hodgson
 2008	Stiggy Hodgson
 2009  Chris Lloyd
 2010  Ben Taylor

Girls
 1990	Elaine Wilson
 1991	Mhairi McKay
 1992	Andrea Murray
 1993 	Georgina Simpson
 1994	Rebecca Hudson
 1995	Rebecca Hudson
 1996	Vicki Laing
 1997	Rebecca Hudson
 1998	Louise Kenney
 1999	Rachel Adby
 2000	Sophie Walker
 2001	Sophie Walker
 2002	Steph Evans
 2003	Natalie Haywood
 2004	Melissa Reid
 2005	Jodi Ewart
 2006	Sally Watson
 2007	Carly Booth
 2008	Carly Booth
 2009  Alexandra Peters
 2010  Hayley Davis

Abu Dhabi's sponsorship 
Abu Dhabi Tourism Authority have Title Sponsored the event since 2009 Abu Dhabi Tourism Authority (ADTA).

The involvement of ADTA, which manages and develops the emirate’s tourism industry, is part of its strategy to market Abu Dhabi as a premier golfing destination.

Abu Dhabi is home to the annual Abu Dhabi Golf Championship, a European Tour event that, along with the Qatar Masters and the Dubai Desert Classic, forms part of the early-season Gulf Swing of January and February each year.

Like the ADJGC, the Abu Dhabi Golf Championship is held at the Abu Dhabi Golf Club.

2009 championship 

Chris Lloyd completed a thrilling finish to the tournament by overhauling long-time leader Tom Lewis to take the boys title. In the girls match, Alexandra Peters held on to her overnight lead on the final day to take the trophy.

Lloyd played a winning final round of 73 to beat Lewis, who had led by eight shots at the end of the first round and four shots going into the final day's play. Lloyd, 17, from Bristol, bore down on Lewis and took the lead on the 12th hole. With a one shot lead going into the final hole he held his nerve to win with a final score of 11 under. Tomasz Anderson took third place with a score of four over.

Peters clinched the girls’ championship with a final score of five under, leaving her well ahead of nearest rival Jessica Wilcox who ended the tournament on level par. The 16-year-old, from Shifnal, Nottinghamshire, had gone into the final day with a four-shot lead and never looked in danger of losing it.

Finishing strongly, Wilcox jumped into second place helped by a run of three birdies on the front nine, ahead of Holly Clyburn and Heidi Baek who both recorded scores of three over.

2008 championship 
Stiggy Hodgson holed a 15-ft birdie putt on the second playoff hole to beat Tommy Fleetwood and win the 2008 Abu Dhabi Junior Golf Championship boys title. The two leaders finished 12 shots ahead of the field by finishing 12 under par over the three rounds.

Hodgson, who plays with an unorthodox swing with its exaggerated head turn, did not drop a shot until the last hole, a poor bunker recovery and three-putt against Fleetwood's seventh birdie, cancelling out a seemingly decisive two-stroke lead to take the final into sudden death. 

Carly Booth, meanwhile, was untroubled by any of the competing girls as she decisively took the title. Her win by six shots at four under illustrated her mastery of the Abu Dhabi Golf Club’s National course.

External links 
 Tournament homepage
 Abu Dhabi Golf Club
 Abu Dhabi Tourism & Culture Authority

References 

Golf tournaments in the United Arab Emirates
Junior golf tournaments